Karman Kaur Thandi (born 16 June 1998) is an Indian professional tennis player. She has been a previous Indian No. 1 in singles.

Thandi has career-high WTA rankings of 196 in singles, as of 20 August 2018, and No. 180 in doubles, as of 14 January 2019.

Tennis career
She started playing tennis at the age of eight.

Thandi is the sixth Indian female tennis player to enter the top 200 of the WTA rankings, after the likes of Nirupama Sanjeev, Sania Mirza, Shikha Uberoi, Sunitha Rao, and Ankita Raina.

Thandi has won four doubles titles and three singles titles on the ITF Circuit- the maiden singles title in $25k Hong Kong tournament on 23 June 2018, and the doubles titles in 2017 in Heraklion, and two in 2015 in Gulbarga. On the ITF Junior Circuit, she achieved a career-high ranking of 32 in January 2016. Additionally, she also made it to the semifinals in two other tournaments in China.

Since 2017 she has represented India in Fed Cup, with a career win–loss record of 3–7 in singles and of 2–1 in doubles.

Karman is supported by the RoundGlass Tennis Academy, Chandigarh and currently trains at the academy under coach Aditya Sachdeva.

Thandi participated in the 2018 Asian Games, with Divij Sharan in mixed-doubles event. They defeated Filipino pairing of Marian Jane Capadocia and Alberto Lim jr in their first match in the Games. But the pair was ousted in third round.

Thandi became the first Indian player to win a WTA Tour main-draw match (defeating Lu Jiajing at the 2018 Jiangxi International Open) since Sania Mirza's victory over Kristina Barrois at the 2012 Indian Wells Open.

Performance timelines

Sourced from WTA
Only main-draw results in WTA Tour, Grand Slam tournaments, Fed Cup/Billie Jean King Cup and Olympic Games are included in win–loss records.

Singles
Current through the 2022 Chennai Open.

WTA 125 tournament finals

Doubles: 1 (1 title)

ITF Circuit finals

Singles: 11 (3 titles, 8 runner–ups)

Doubles: 8 (4 titles, 4 runner–ups)

Fed Cup/Billie Jean King Cup participation

Singles (0–2)

Doubles (1–0)

References

External links
 
 
 

1998 births
Living people
Indian female tennis players
Tennis players at the 2018 Asian Games
Asian Games competitors for India